The 1981 Ballon d'Or, given to the best football player in Europe as judged by a panel of sports journalists from UEFA member countries, was awarded to Karl-Heinz Rummenigge on 29 December 1981. 

This was Rummenigge's second win in succession.

Rankings

References

External links
 France Football Official Ballon d'Or page

1981
1981–82 in European football